Bobby Craig (8 April 1935 – 1 October 2010) was a Scottish footballer, who played for Third Lanark, Sheffield Wednesday, Blackburn Rovers, Celtic, St Johnstone, Oldham Athletic, Toronto City and Johannesburg Wanderers as an inside-right. Craig played in the final match played by Third Lanark before the club went out of business. After retiring as a player he settled in Toronto, where he died aged 75.

References

External links 

1935 births
2010 deaths
Footballers from Airdrie, North Lanarkshire
Association football inside forwards
Scottish footballers
Third Lanark A.C. players
Sheffield Wednesday F.C. players
Blackburn Rovers F.C. players
Celtic F.C. players
St Johnstone F.C. players
Oldham Athletic A.F.C. players
Toronto City players
Scottish Football League players
English Football League players
Scottish expatriate footballers
Expatriate soccer players in South Africa
Expatriate soccer players in Canada
Scottish expatriate sportspeople in Canada